Grammopsoides is a genus of beetles in the family Cerambycidae, containing the following species:

 Grammopsoides picta Galileo & Martins, 1995
 Grammopsoides tenuicornis (Casey, 1913)

References

Agapanthiini